Kommunistiska Enhetsgrupperna was a section that left Kommunistiska Partiet Marxist-Leninisterna (revolutionärerna) in 1975. KEG considered that KPML(r):s politics towards the trade unions was ultra-leftist and sectarian. KEG was dissolved in 1977, and most of the members later joined SKP.

The KEG group in Stockholm, Stockholms Kommunistiska Enhetsgrupp, continued to exist until 1979. In that year SKEG merged with the Communist Association of Norrköping to form SKF-ml.

KEG published Enhet ('Unity') 1975–1977.

References

1975 establishments in Sweden
1979 disestablishments in Sweden
Communist organizations in Sweden
Defunct organizations based in Sweden
Organizations disestablished in 1979
Organizations established in 1975